Hanzaf (also Romanized as Hanzāf) is a village in Khenaman Rural District, in the Central District of Rafsanjan County, Kerman Province, Iran. At the 2006 census, its population was 7, in 4 families.

References 

Populated places in Rafsanjan County